Evil Dead Trap (known in Japan as  lit. Trap of The Dead Spirits) is a 1988 Japanese slasher film directed by Toshiharu Ikeda and produced by Japan Home Video.

Plot

TV show host Nami asks her viewers to send in home movies; she receives a snuff film apparently shot at a nearby factory. Taking a camera crew out to investigate, Nami finds the factory deserted. As Nami and her crew begin to scour the factory, they are murdered one-by-one in grisly fashion until only Nami remains. She ultimately discovers that the killer is Hideki, a small, fetus-like man conjoined to his fully grown, naive twin-brother, who seems unaware of the killings.

Cast
 Miyuki Ono as Nami Tsuchiya
 Yuji Honma as Daisuke Muraki
 Hitomi Kobayashi as Rei Sugiura
 Shinsuke Shimada as the TV producer
 Aya Katsuragi as Masako Abe
 Masahiko Abe as Akio Kondou
 Eriko Nakagawa as Rya Kawamura
 Mari Shimizu as the voice of Hideki
 Kyōko Hashimoto
 Terumi Niki as the voice of Haha no Koe

Production

Special effects were by Shinichi Wakasa who would go on to a career as a monster-suit maker for several Godzilla films.

Hitomi Kobayashi who plays the supporting role of Rei Sugiura was a top star for Japan Home Video (JHV) under their adult video (AV) label Alice Japan. JHV financed the film as a vehicle for Kobayashi, but director Toshiharu Ikeda, unsure of Kobayashi's acting ability, instead put Miyuki Ono in the starring role.

Release
On November 7, 2000, the film was released on DVD in the United States by Synapse Films. The release included the original theatrical trailer, and  audio commentary by director Ikeda and special effects manager Shinichi Wakasa.

Reception

Evil Dead Trap received positive reviews from critics, with praise highlighting the film's mixing of giallo and slasher film genres, cinematography, and special effects, while most criticism was directed at the film's weak ending.

Jon Condit from Dread Central rated the film a score of three out of five, highlighting the soundtrack, story, and cinematography as being reminiscent to Dario Argento's giallo films. While calling the film "fun and well crafted", Condit criticized the film's weak ending. Niina Doherty  of HorrorNews.net also criticized the film's ending, while commending the cinematography, special effects, and mixture of elements from slasher and giallo films. Empire Magazines Mark Dinning gave the film four out of five stars, commending the film's cinematography, gore effects, and style, calling it, "an effective and bloody slasher let down only by its last act".
In their book Japanese Cinema: Essential Handbook, authors Thomas and Yuko Weisser awarded the film four out of four stars, calling it the best of contemporary J-Horror cinema, while also noting Argento's films as obvious inspiration.

Legacy

References

Bibliography
 
 Weisser, Thomas. (1998). "Asian Cult Cinema Report: Film, News and Gossip", in Asian Cult Cinema, #22, 1st Quarter, 1999, p. 4-6. (American premier of Evil Dead Trap)

External links
 
 
 
 

1988 films
1988 horror films
1980s slasher films
Films about television people
Films directed by Toshiharu Ikeda
Films set in factories
Japanese slasher films
1980s Japanese-language films
Films about twin brothers
Films about snuff films
Murder in films
1980s Japanese films